Elie Norbert (born January 23, 1984) is a Malagasy judoka who competed in the 60-kg category. He represented Madagascar at the 2008 Summer Olympics in Beijing, after winning the bronze medal at the 2007 All-Africa Games in Algiers, Algeria. Norbert received a bye for the second round, before losing out to North Korea's Kim Kyong-Jin, who scored an ippon to end an allotted time of eight minutes in the first period.

References

External links
 
 NBC Olympic Profile

1984 births
Living people
Malagasy male judoka
Olympic judoka of Madagascar
Judoka at the 2008 Summer Olympics
African Games bronze medalists for Madagascar
African Games medalists in judo
Competitors at the 2007 All-Africa Games